Werner Müller may refer to:

 Werner Müller (ethnologist) (1907–1990), German ethnologist and symbologist
 Werner Müller (musician) (1920–1998), German musician
 Werner Müller (canoeist) (born 1922), Swiss canoeist
 Werner Müller (politician) (1946–2019), German manager and politician, Minister for Economics
 Werner Müller (mathematician) (born 1949), German mathematician
 Werner Mueller (sport shooter), Austrian competitor in shooting at the 1988 Summer Paralympics

See also
Otto-Werner Mueller (1926–2016), German-born conductor